The Canon EF-S 60mm f/2.8 Macro USM lens is Canon's first EF-S (APS-C sensor-specific) macro lens, and also the company's first prime lens made specifically for the EF-S mount. Introduced in 2005, it was the only EF-S prime lens until the announcement of the EF-S 24mm f/2.8 STM in September 2014; a second EF-S macro lens, the EF-S 35mm f/2.8 Macro IS STM, was added to the lens lineup in April 2017. As an EF-S lens, it can only be used on cameras with a 1.6x crop factor and is the equivalent of a 96mm lens mounted on a 35mm format camera. As such this lens also can be a good choice for portrait photography.

Its front element does not rotate, nor does it protrude when focusing. This is especially useful when working with a polarization filter or close to the subject.

The circular aperture results in a pleasantly soft bokeh.

Example images

References 

60mm
Macro lenses
Camera lenses introduced in 2005